Paerata railway station was a flag station,  south of Auckland, on the North Island Main Trunk in New Zealand, serving the Paerata settlement.

The station was opened on 20 May 1875. It was closed to passengers on 24 July 1972, and to all traffic on 1 October 1982. A crossing loop was retained.

In 1981 Paerata junction to the Waiuku Branch was re-designed and resignalled, with a new connection towards Pukekohe.

History 
The line from Ōtāhuhu reached Paerata in 1873 and opened to Mercer on 20 May 1875. A building was erected in 1874 for £30. By 1884, when Paerata first appeared in timetables, there was a shelter shed and a passing loop for 22 wagons. By 1896 there was also a passenger platform with a cart approach and a 28 wagon loop. Sheep yards and a loading bank followed and, from 1906, a Post Office was run by station staff, which moved to Messent's store in 1923. In preparation for the Waiuku Branch, the loop was extended in 1913 to 70 wagons, two cottages and a goods shed were built in 1914 and the station became an island platform in 1917. The gradient on the Karaka bank, between Runciman and Paerata, was eased from 1 in 40 to 1 in 100 between 1914 and 1916. The work included large cuttings and embankments. One of the slips in 1916 was temporarily bypassed by relaying track on the old alignment. Paerata became a junction station from 10 December 1917, when the first section of the Waiuku Branch opened as far as Patumahoe. The initial service on the branch in 1922 was only a train each way on Tuesdays and Fridays. Automatic signalling replaced token blocks in 1926. In 1928 35 wagons were derailed between Pukekohe and Paerata.

Duplication of line between Papakura and Paerata was completed by 3 December 1939 and to Pukekohe in 1941. From 1923 until at least 1943, the dairy factory had a private siding.

On 24 July 1972 Paerata closed to all traffic, except in wagon lots. The stockyards were removed and the goods shed  moved to Ōtāhuhu Rail Weld Depot in 1973. In 1978 the goods shed loop was sold to Glenbrook Vintage Railway. The station closed to all traffic on 17 July 1977. By 1982 the station building had been demolished.

New station 

New train stations for Drury West and Paerata are included in a July 2017 proposal for Auckland infrastructure spending of $600 million to support new housing announced by the government. They will be built and owned by a new Crown Infrastructure Partners body, as the Auckland Council has reached its borrowing limit.

See also 
List of Auckland railway stations

References

External links 

 1927 photo of station
1972 aerial photo
 1973 photos of station

Defunct railway stations in New Zealand
Buildings and structures in the Auckland Region
Rail transport in the Auckland Region
Rail transport in Auckland
Railway stations opened in 1875
Railway stations closed in 1982